The Downriver League is an athletic conference for high schools in Michigan. It was formed in 2009 after the dissolution of the Michigan Mega Conference by schools in the "Downriver" area of Metro Detroit. In 2018, Dearborn Edsel Ford was brought into the league to the fill the opening left by Taylor Kennedy after it closed and consolidated with Taylor Truman to make Taylor High. In 2019, Melvindale left to join the Western Wayne Athletic Conference.

Member schools

Membership timeline

Football
This list goes through the 2021 season.

References

Michigan high school sports conferences
2009 establishments in Michigan